Linum puberulum is a species of flax known by the common name plains flax. It is native to the western and midwestern United States from California to Nebraska to Texas, where it grows in dry, open habitat including desert, semi-desert, hills and low mountains. It is a downy-haired perennial herb producing an erect, branching stem lined with glandular linear leaves up to about 1 centimeter long. The inflorescence is a wide open cyme of golden yellow to yellow-orange flowers each with five petals 1 to 1.5 centimeters in length. The fruit is a capsule about 4 millimeters wide.

Uses

The Zuni people squeeze the berry juice into the eye for inflammation.

References

External links
Jepson Manual Treatment
Southwest Colorado Wildflowers
Photo gallery

puberulum
Flora of the United States
Plants used in traditional Native American medicine